Evon Joan Fraser (11 September 1934 – 16 August 2012) was a New Zealand cricketer who played as a right-handed batter. She appeared in two Test matches for New Zealand in 1957. She played domestic cricket for Canterbury.

References

1934 births
2012 deaths
Cricketers from Christchurch
New Zealand women cricketers
New Zealand women Test cricketers
Canterbury Magicians cricketers